Lauren Scruggs Kennedy is an American fashion blogger and author who received international media attention after a December 3, 2011 incident in which she walked into a spinning propeller, losing her left eye and severing her left hand. On August 9, 2012, she made her first public appearance following the accident during an interview on the Today show.

Personal life 
On May 30, 2014, Scruggs became engaged to television personality Jason Kennedy. The couple were married on December 12, 2014. Lauren and Jason welcomed their son, Ryver Rhodes Kennedy, on April 3, 2022. 

Her first book, Still Lolo: A Spinning Propeller, a Horrific Accident, and a Family's Journey of Hope, was published in 2012 and her second book, Your Beautiful Heart, was released in March 2015.

She is founder of the Lauren Scruggs Kennedy Foundation, which provides prostheses to women in need.

Scruggs is a Christian.

References 

1988 births
American amputees
American bloggers
American fashion journalists
American female models
American women journalists
Living people
People from Plano, Texas
American women bloggers
Journalists from Texas
21st-century American non-fiction writers
American Christians
21st-century American women writers